The 2008 Grote Prijs Jef Scherens was the 42nd edition of the Grote Prijs Jef Scherens cycle race and was held on 7 September 2008. The race started and finished in Leuven. The race was won by Wouter Mol.

General classification

References

2008
2008 in road cycling
2008 in Belgian sport